Lost Creek Airport  is a public use airport located three nautical miles (6 km) northeast of the central business district of Luzerne, in Oscoda County, Michigan, United States. It is owned by the U.S. Department of Agriculture.

Facilities and aircraft 
Lost Creek Airport covers an area of 77 acres (31 ha) at an elevation of 1,051 feet (320 m) above mean sea level. It has two runways with turf surfaces: 18/36 is 2,600 by 100 feet (792 x 30 m) and 5/23 is 2,200 by 100 feet (671 x 30 m). For the 12-month period ending December 31, 2010, the airport had 150 general aviation aircraft operations.

References

External links 
  at the Michigan Airport Directory
 Aerial image as of April 1999 from USGS The National Map

Airports in Michigan
Transportation in Oscoda County, Michigan
United States Department of Agriculture